QR III (or Quiet Riot III) is the fifth studio album released by American heavy metal band Quiet Riot. It was released in 1986 on Pasha / CBS. It is the last album to feature lead singer Kevin DuBrow until the 1993 album Terrified.

Background 
QR III is short for "Quiet Riot III".  It is  the band's fifth studio album, following limited release albums Quiet Riot and Quiet Riot II, and major label albums Metal Health and Condition Critical.  Following the massive success of Metal Health and the more reasonable success of Condition Critical, sales of QR III were lower, reaching only No. 31 on the US charts. It marked one of Quiet Riot's final plunges from stardom as only one more of the band's following releases would enter the charts at all.

This Quiet Riot album is the first  album to feature Chuck Wright, formerly of Giuffria, on bass as an official member. He had performed bass work on 2 tracks from Metal Health. He would rejoin the band on an on/off basis over the years, and re-joined the band for years afterward.

The lead single, "The Wild and the Young", is a stadium hymn to the energy of youth. Its accompanying video (featuring game show host Wink Martindale in a cameo appearance) painted an Orwellian picture of the future, where totalitarian militarists fought to wipe out rock and roll—a reference to the Senate hearings concerning explicit language in metal songs.

Track listing 
Credits taken from album liner notes.

Personnel

Quiet Riot 
 Kevin DuBrow – lead vocals, backing vocals, guitar
 Carlos Cavazo – guitar, backing vocals
 Chuck Wright – bass, backing vocals
 Frankie Banali – drums, electric & acoustic percussion

Additional personnel 
 John Purdell – keyboards, programming
 Marcus Barone – EMU sampling, emulator
 Bobby Kimball – backing vocals on "Still of the Night"
 Debra Raye, Michelle Rohl – backing vocals on "The Pump"
 Jimmy Whitney and the Bible of Dreams Choir – backing vocals on "Slave to Love"

Production 
 Spencer Proffer – producer
 John Purdell – producer
 Hugh Syme – art direction and cover painting

Charts and certifications

References 

1986 albums
Quiet Riot albums
Albums produced by John Purdell
Pasha Records albums